John A. Fusco (born September 7, 1937) is an American lawyer, jurist, and politician from the New York City Borough of Staten Island.

Fusco represented parts of Central Staten Island and Bensonhurst, Brooklyn in the New York City Council until his election to the New York Surrogate's Court for Richmond County, New York in November 1998. He served as Minority Whip in the Council till his departure.

He was appointed to the New York Supreme Court by then Governor Eliot Spitzer in 2008, and reached the mandatory retirement age in 2013.

References

1937 births
Living people
New York City Council members
New York (state) Republicans
New York Supreme Court Justices
Politicians from Staten Island
21st-century American politicians
American people of Italian descent